The Ogden Air Logistics Complex (OO-ALC) performs programmed depot maintenance on a number of US Air Force weapon systems.  Specifically it supports A-10 Thunderbolt II, B-2 Spirit, F-16 Fighting Falcon, and LGM-30G Minuteman III systems.  Additionally, the center is responsible for landing gear systems, conventional munitions, solid propellants, and composite materials. It is located at Hill Air Force Base.

The former Ogden Air Logistics Center was re-designated as the Ogden Air Logistics Complex on 12 July 2012.

Since 2012 the Complex has supervised the 309th Aerospace Maintenance and Regeneration Group at Davis-Monthan Air Force Base.

Lineage

Established as Ogden Air Depot Control Area Command on 19 January 1943.  Activated on 1 February 1943.  
Redesignated:
 Ogden Air Service Command on 17 May 1943; 
 Ogden Air Technical Service Command on 14 November 1944; 
 Ogden Air Materiel Area on 2 July 1946; 
 Ogden Air Logistics Center on 1 April 1974; 
 Ogden Air Logistics Complex, 12 July 2012.

List of commanders
 Brig Gen Steven Bleymaier
 Brig Gen Stacey Hawkins
 Maj Gen McCauley von Hoffman
 Brig Gen Richard W. Gibbs

References

External links
Ogden Air Logistics Complex Fact Sheet

Military units and formations in Utah
Military units and formations established in 2012
Logistics units and formations of the United States Air Force